Houffalize is a city and municipality of Wallonia located in the province of Luxembourg, Belgium. 

The municipality consists of the following districts: Houffalize, Mabompré, Mont, Nadrin, Tailles, Tavigny, and Wibrin. Other population centers include Achouffe, Alboumont, Bœur, Bonnerue, Buret, Cetturu, Chabrehez, Cowan, Dinez, Engreux, Filly, Fontenaille, Mormont, Ollomont, Pisserotte, Sommerain, Taverneux, Vellereux, Vissoûle, Wandebourcy, and Wilogne.

History

Houffalize was a strategic location during the Battle of the Bulge of World War II.  Specifically, Generals Montgomery and Patton met up here, Montgomery coming from the north and Patton from the south, in their counter-attack against the German forces remaining in the area. The town was flattened on the night of 5–6 January 1945 by ninety RAF  Lancasters of Bomber Command to block the key crossroads for German supply columns and the escape route for German forces. Patton wrote a poem in his diary about the bombing.

International relations

Twin towns - Sister cities
Houffalize is a founding member of the Douzelage, a unique town twinning association of 24 towns across the European Union. This active town twinning began in 1991 and there are regular events, such as a produce market from each of the other countries and festivals.  Discussions regarding membership are also in hand with three further towns (Agros in Cyprus, Škofja Loka in Slovenia, and Tryavna in Bulgaria).

See also
 List of protected heritage sites in Houffalize
 Brasserie d'Achouffe

References

External links

Official website (in French and Dutch)

 
Cities in Wallonia
Municipalities of Luxembourg (Belgium)